West Bridgford Methodist Church, formerly Musters Road Methodist Church, is in West Bridgford. Nottingham. It is a Grade II listed building. It is part of the Nottingham South circuit of the Methodist Church of Great Britain.

History
The congregation formed from was formed from Arkwright Street chapel. The site was purchased in 1887-8, and the school was built first.

The building of the church followed in 1899, to designs by local architect Richard Charles Sutton.  The tower clock, bells, and organ were given by Mr. Henry Clarke. The eastern stained-glass window was contributed by Mr. and Mrs. W. Maggs.

References

Churches in Nottingham
Churches completed in 1899
Gothic Revival church buildings in England
Gothic Revival architecture in Nottinghamshire
Methodist churches in Nottinghamshire
Grade II listed churches in Nottinghamshire
West Bridgford